The Takhini Arena is a 1,535-seat multi-purpose arena in Whitehorse, Yukon, Canada. It is home to the Yukon Claim Jumpers ice hockey team and the Whitehorse Huskies Triple A men's hockey team.

During the 2007 Canada Winter Games it hosted ice hockey and ringette as well as during the 2012 Arctic Winter Games.

References

Indoor ice hockey venues in Canada
Indoor arenas in Canada
Buildings and structures in Whitehorse
Sports venues in Yukon
Canada Games venues
Sports venues completed in 1975
1975 establishments in Yukon